Cricket-spitting is a sport wherein contestants place a dead cricket in their mouth, and then spit it as far as they can. The contestant who can spit the cricket the farthest is declared the winner.

Cricket-spitting was developed in 1996 by entomologist Tom Turpin at Purdue University in West Lafayette, Indiana, as a competition for their annual Bug Bowl event, which brings over 30,000 people per year to their campus for a series of insect-related events and competitions. Since its creation, other universities have begun their own competitions, such as Pennsylvania State University who have hosted their own 'spit-off' since 1998. A Scottish spin off of Cricket-Spitting is Wasp Waving, where contestants throw frozen wasps at a target while blind folded.

World record

Robert Tony Ferrell, from Hoopeston, Illinois, held the title/record in the 1997 Bug Bowl Games until upset by Dan Capps. Unofficial records of over 38 feet have been noted at competitions.

Rules

Note: The ruleset is not fixed, and is subject to change or modification by organizations hosting their own competitions.

 The crickets are to be brown house crickets (Acheta domesticus), weighing between 45 and 55 milligrams.
 Crickets should be previously frozen, then thawed for the record attempt.
 Contestants must spit within 20 seconds of placing the cricket in their mouth.
 The distance will be measured from the center of the edge of the spitting circle, to where the cricket comes to rest, using a measuring tape.
 Contestants must not step outside of the red circle they stand in.
 The cricket must be fully intact, and held fully in the mouth before the contestant may enter the spitting circle.
 The cricket must remain intact, and an official must check the spat cricket for six legs, four wings, and two antenna before the spit can be counted.

References

External links
 Purdue University's Bug Bowl
 Guinness World Records video of Danny Capp's record setting spit

See also

 Cockroach racing

Animals in sport
Crickets
Individual sports